Peprilus is a genus of fish in the family Stromateidae found in Pacific and Atlantic Oceans.

Species
There are currently 9 recognized species in this genus:
 Peprilus burti Fowler, 1944 (Gulf butterfish)
 Peprilus crenulatus G. Cuvier, 1829  
 Peprilus medius (W. K. H. Peters, 1869) (Pacific harvestfish) 
 Peprilus ovatus Horn, 1970 (Shining butterfish)
 Peprilus paru (Linnaeus, 1758) (American harvestfish) 
 Peprilus simillimus (Ayres, 1860) (Pacific pompano) 
 Peprilus snyderi C. H. Gilbert & Starks, 1904 (Salema butterfish)
 Peprilus triacanthus (W. Peck, 1804) (Atlantic butterfish) 
 Peprilus xanthurus (Quoy & Gaimard, 1825)

References

Stromateidae
Taxa named by Georges Cuvier